Arthur Fairclough may refer to:

 Arthur Fairclough (football manager) (1873–?), football club manager
 Arthur Bradfield Fairclough (1896–1968), World War I flying ace